The 2008 World Junior AAA Championship was held in Edmonton, Alberta, Canada, from July 25 to August 3, 2008.

Group stage

Pool A
 5–0
 4–1
 3–2
 2–3
 1–4
 0–5

Pool B
 4–1
 4–1
 3–2
 3–2
 1–4
 0–5

Knockout stage

Fifth through eighth place

Final standings

See also
World Junior Baseball Championship

External links
IBAF official website
International Baseball Foundation official website

World Junior Baseball Championship, 2008
U-18 Baseball World Cup
2008
Baseball in Edmonton
World Junior Baseball Championship
World Junior Baseball Championship
2000s in Edmonton
2008 in Manitoba